The SS Faith was the first concrete ship built in the United States. It was constructed by the San Francisco Shipbuilding Company in 1918 owned by William Leslie Comyn. It cost $750,000.

The construction 
Work began September 1, 1917; concrete pouring began October 31, 1917 and ended February 26, 1918. 
The Steam Ship (SS) Faith launched on March 14, 1918, from Redwood City, California. The ship was designed by Alan Macdonald and Victor Poss.  
It pulled up to 5000 tons, being the largest concrete ship of its time.

Dimensions 
102,56 x 13,56 x 6,86 metres 336.5 x 44.5 x 22.5 feet
6125 tons
2 triple expansion steam machines
1760 Horsepower 
10 knots

History 
"[...] said William Leslie Comyn [...] he likewise pointed out the lack of steel-making plants and shipyards on the West Coast. His solution: build ships of concrete. [...] He was convinced that a 5,000-ton concrete freighter could be operated at a profit and on 3 September 1917 he solicited contractual support from USSB to build "five reinforced concrete steamers" [...] On speculation, then, his firm began to build the Faith at Redwood City, California"

The first journeys were to Honolulu, Balboa, Callao, Valparaíso and New York. In 1919, the San Francisco Shipbuilding company was sold to French American SS lines, and in 1921, the SS Faith was used as a breakwater in Cuba. She was broken up in 1926.

Articles 
NY Times, March 15th, 1918
NY Times, May 5th, 1918

References

External links 
San Diego History concrete ships
Images of the construction and launching of the SS Faith

Steamships
Ships built in San Francisco
1918 ships
Concrete ships
Ships sunk as breakwaters